Eremo di Sant'Angelo (Italian for Hermitage of Sant'Angelo) is an hermitage located in Lettomanoppello, Province of Pescara (Abruzzo, Italy).

References

Sources

External links

 

Angelo
Lettomanoppello